The  was an infantry division of the Imperial Japanese Army. It was formed 28 February 1945 in Kanazawa as a square division. It was a part of the 16 simultaneously created divisions batch numbering from 140th to 160th.

Action
The 152nd division was initially assigned to 11th area army. In April 1945 it was reassigned to 52nd army and sent from Kanazawa to Chōshi in Kantō region, where it performed a coastal defense duties until surrender of Japan 15 August 1945 without seeing an actual combat.
The 437th infantry regiment was garrisoning Chōshi, the 440th - west Chōshi, 438th - Asahi, Chiba (building defenses on south-western bank of Tone River), and 439th infantry regiment - Omigawa, Chiba.

See also
 List of Japanese Infantry Divisions

Notes and references
This article incorporates material from Japanese Wikipedia page 第152師団 (日本軍), accessed 13 July 2016
 Madej, W. Victor, Japanese Armed Forces Order of Battle, 1937–1945 [2 vols], Allentown, PA: 1981.

Japanese World War II divisions
Infantry divisions of Japan
Military units and formations established in 1945
Military units and formations disestablished in 1945
1945 establishments in Japan
1945 disestablishments in Japan